"Islands" is the title and closing track of the album of the same name by the progressive rock band, King Crimson, released in 1971. The song's pastoral, mellow, and quiet feeling (the lyrics talk of a peaceful island) distinguish it from the album's first four tracks. The song was played live only a few times in 1971, with Collins using a regular concert flute, and Fripp playing guitar in place of Marc Charig's cornet.

"Islands" was revived on the band's 2017 North American summer tour with the Radical Action lineup of Fripp, Collins (with bass flute, and covering the oboe and cornet parts on soprano saxophone), bassist Tony Levin, guitarist/vocalist Jakko Jakszyk, keyboardist Bill Rieflin (playing the harmonium part), drummers Pat Mastelotto and Gavin Harrison, and drummer/keyboardist Jeremy Stacey (on piano).  The band has continued to perform the track live in subsequent tours.

Personnel
Robert Fripp – guitar, mellotron, harmonium
Boz Burrell – vocals, bass
Ian Wallace – drums, percussion
Mel Collins – bass flute
Peter Sinfield – lyrics

with:
Keith Tippett – piano
Mark Charig – cornet
Harry Miller – double bass
Robin Miller – oboe
Uncredited musicians – strings

References 

1971 songs
Songs with lyrics by Peter Sinfield
King Crimson songs
Songs written by Robert Fripp